Archdeacon  John Douglas Giles  (28 November 1812 – 5 February 1867) was an Anglican priest who was Archdeacon of Stow from 1862 until his death.

Giles was born in  Wedmore  and educated at Corpus Christi College, Oxford.  He held livings at Swinstead, Belleau and Willoughby.

In 1845, he married Sarah Elizabeth Allen. They had at least seven children, including civil servants Robert Giles  and Edward Giles  who both served in British India.

He died in Willoughby, aged 54.

References

1812 births
19th-century English Anglican priests
Alumni of Corpus Christi College, Oxford
Archdeacons of Stow
1867 deaths
People from Somerset